Santissimo Redentore e Santa Maria ("The Holiest Redeemer and St Mary") is a Romanesque-style, deconsecrated Roman Catholic church located in the town of Visso, province of Macerata, region of Marche, Italy. Typically, the Italian title is S.S. Redentore e S. Maria.

History 
The stone church was built in the 13th century. It has a single nave with three internal arches, somewhat acute, and adjoining square-based bell tower. The main altar was erected by the Confraternity of Santa Maria, which patronized the church. The interior were frescoed with a Madonna of the Rosary surrounded by the mysteries of the Rosary and a God the father with the Prophets Isaiah and Jeremiah. During a pastoral visit in 1712, the church was noted to be overburdened with seven lateral altars. The church underwent restoration in 1978 and after the 1997 earthquake.

References 

Romanesque architecture in le Marche
13th-century Roman Catholic church buildings in Italy
Visso
Roman Catholic churches in the Marche